Themba Mkhize is a South African jazz pianist and composer. Born in KwaZulu Natal, Mkhizehas played with  South African bands including Bayethe and Sakhile.

Early years
Mkhize's interest in music was sparked at an early age. Over the years he has shared the stage with a number of South African as well as international artists. Mkhize's son Afrika is also a well established pianist.

References

Living people
South African film score composers
Male film score composers
South African jazz musicians
21st-century pianists
21st-century male musicians
Male jazz musicians
Year of birth missing (living people)